The Eelam National Liberation Front (ENLF) was a short-lived (1984-1986) umbrella organisation for leading Sri Lankan Tamil militant groups.

Formation
In April 1984 M. Karunanidhi invited the leaders of the five leading Tamil militant groups, Eelam People's Revolutionary Liberation Front (EPRLF), Eelam Revolutionary Organisation of Students (EROS), Liberation Tigers of Tamil Eelam (LTTE), People's Liberation Organisation of Tamil Eelam (PLOTE) and Tamil Eelam Liberation Organization (TELO), for talks aimed at uniting the groups. K. Pathmanabha (EPRLF), V. Balakumaran (EROS) and Sri Sabaratnam (TELO) accepted the invitation but Velupillai Prabhakaran (LTTE) and Uma Maheswaran (PLOTE) did not.

Shortly afterward EPRLF, EROS and TELO formed the Eelam National Liberation Front. The inaugural meeting of the ENLF was held at the EPRLF's office in Madras (now Chennai) and Ramesh of the EPRLF was elected the secretary. After the meeting Pathmanabha, Balakumaran and Sri Sabaratnam issued a statement announcing the formation of the ENLF:

Although the ENLF members would work together to achieve their common aim they would each maintain their own distinct identity. Other major liberation groups i.e. LTTE and PLOTE, were invited to join the ENLF. The objectives of the ENLF were:

 Winning the independence for our motherland from the domination of the Sri Lanka.
 Pledge to work for the full independence of Tamil Eelam and decision to accept nothing less.
 Adopt armed struggle as our path to freedom and endeavour to unite all sections of our people.
 Building a socialist society in Tamil Eelam.
 Liberating our motherland from the shackles of American imperialism and neocolonialism.

The ENLF members agreed to coordinate armed activities against the Sri Lankan armed forces; unify propaganda conducted in foreign countries; and create a unified body to administer the funds collected from individuals and institutions.

LTTE joins ENLF
In early 1985 Prabhakaran changed his mind about the ENLF and decided to join. On 10 April 1985 senior members of the ENLF and LTTE met at the Hotel Presidency, Madras. Those attending the meeting were: LTTE – Prabhakaran, Rajanayagam and Anton Balasingham; EPRLF – Pathmanabha, Kulasegaran and Ramesh; EROS – Balakumaran and Muhilan; TELO – Sri Sabaratnam and Mathi. After the meeting a statement was issued:

The objectives of the ENLF were revised to:
 Winning the freedom and sovereignty of our motherland from the oppressive rule of Sri Lanka.
 Not to accept any solution lesser than the establishment of an independent state with the right to self-determination.
 Adopting mass armed struggle (People's Struggle) as the mode of struggle.
 Taking forward the socialist revolution along with the freedom struggle and building a socialist society in our motherland.
 Delivering our nation from the clutches of global imperialism and neocolonialism and leading it on the path of nonalignment.

The ENLF members agreed to make joint political decisions and to coordinate military actions against the Sri Lankan armed forces. The unity amongst the Tamil militant groups was widely welcomed by supporters of the Tamil independence movement.

LTTE lefts ENLF, dissolution
In February 1986, the LTTE pulled out of the ENLF. By April 1986, the ENLF had become defunct.

References

Factions in the Sri Lankan Civil War
Eelam Revolutionary Organisation of Students
Liberation Tigers of Tamil Eelam
Tamil Eelam Liberation Organization
Tamil Eelam
Sri Lankan Civil War